Konstantin Dmitriyevich Savichev (born 6 March 1994) is a Russian football player who plays as a right midfielder for FC Akron Tolyatti.

Club career
He made his debut in the Russian Professional Football League for FC Spartak-2 Moscow on 16 July 2013 in a game against FC Dynamo Bryansk.

He made his Russian Premier League debut for FC SKA-Khabarovsk on 16 July 2017 in a game against FC Zenit Saint Petersburg.

On 24 January 2019, he signed with FC Yenisey Krasnoyarsk.

Career statistics

References

1994 births
Sportspeople from Bryansk
Living people
Russian footballers
Russia youth international footballers
Russia under-21 international footballers
Association football midfielders
FC Saturn Ramenskoye players
FC Spartak-2 Moscow players
FC SKA-Khabarovsk players
FC Anzhi Makhachkala players
FC Yenisey Krasnoyarsk players
FC Chayka Peschanokopskoye players
FC Akron Tolyatti players
Russian Premier League players
Russian First League players
Russian Second League players